Heffa Schücking is a German environmentalist. She was awarded the Goldman Environmental Prize in 1994, for her works to protect the rainforests.

Today, she mainly works for the NGO urgewald on campaigns to prevent banks and the financial industry from making harmful investments such as cluster ammunition, coal mining or the nuclear industry.

References

German environmentalists
German women environmentalists
Living people
Year of birth missing (living people)
Goldman Environmental Prize awardees